Chasmanthieae is a small tribe of grasses in the subfamily Panicoideae. It belongs to a basal lineage within the subfamily and has only seven species in two genera, Bromuniola with one species in Africa and Chasmanthium from North America. They all use the C3 photosynthetic pathway.

References

External links

Panicoideae
Poaceae tribes